X Games Aspen 2020 were held from January 22 to January 26, 2020 in Aspen, Colorado, United States.

Medal table

 Not including Special Olympics

Results

Skiing

Snowboarding

Snowmobiling / BikeCross 

Ref

References

External links
 
 Results

Winter X Games
2020 in multi-sport events
2020 in winter sports
2020 in American sports
Pitkin County, Colorado
2020 in sports in Colorado
Winter multi-sport events in the United States
International sports competitions hosted by the United States
January 2020 sports events in the United States